Johan Ræder is the name of:

Johan Georg Ræder (1751–1808), military officer
Johan Christopher Ræder (1782–1853), military officer
Johan Philip Thomas Ræder (1795–1869), military officer
Johan Georg Frederik Ræder (1834–1909), civil servant
Georg Ræder, Johan Georg Ræder, (1857–1932), military officer
Johan Christopher Ræder (1859–1943), military officer
Johan Georg Ræder (1889–1959), ophthalmologist
Johan Georg Alexius Ræder (1905–1981), diplomat